Jungle Rules is the second studio album by Moroccan-American rapper French Montana. It was released on July 14, 2017 by Coke Boys, Bad Boy and Epic Records. The album succeeds his mixtape MC4 (2016), which was originally intended to be his second studio album. It features guest appearances from Future, Travis Scott, The Weeknd, Young Thug, Pharrell Williams, Quavo, T.I., Swae Lee, Marc E. Bassy, Chinx and Max B, among others. Production derives from frequent collaborator Harry Fraud, as well as Scott Storch, Detail, London on da Track, Mike Will Made It and others. The album was supported by the singles "No Pressure" featuring Future and "Unforgettable" featuring Swae Lee.

Jungle Rules received generally positive reviews from critics. It debuted at number three on the US Billboard 200, selling 52,000 copies in its first week. In October 2017, the album was certified Gold by the Recording Industry Association of America (RIAA).

Background
The title Jungle Rules was originally announced on August 25, 2015, in the midst of Chris Brown's "One Hell of a Nite Tour" which ran between August and September which the rapper co-headlined. The title was shelved, however, when in October the mixtape was released under the name Coke Zoo. On June 12, 2017, Billboard attended a documentary screening and listening party hosted by French Montana in New York City. The event featured previews of tracks expected on the upcoming sophomore album. In a subsequent radio interview with Angie Martinez, he confirmed having completed recording three upcoming projects, including one being a collaboration, and the other his next album. The title Jungle Rules was revived following his performance at the 2017 BET Awards, where the name and release date was revealed for July 14. The track listing was revealed on July 5, 2017.

Singles
The joint lead singles "No Pressure" and "Unforgettable" were released on April 7, 2017 for streaming and digital download. The latter peaked at number three on the US Billboard Hot 100, becoming the highest-charting single as well as the first top 10 single of his career as lead artist to date.

"A Lie" featuring The Weeknd was sent to rhythmic radio as the album's third official single on August 22, 2017. It peaked at number 75 on the Billboard Hot 100.

"Famous" was sent to rhythmic radio as the album's fourth official single on November 28, 2017. The two remix versions of the song featuring HoodCelebrityy and Adam Levine, were both released on February 9 and August 24, 2018, respectively.

Promotional singles
On July 11, 2017, "Jump" featuring American rapper Travis Scott, was released as a promotional single.

Critical reception

Jungle Rules received generally favorable reviews from critics upon release. At Metacritic, which assigns a normalized rating out of 100 to reviews from mainstream publications, the album received an average score of 68, based on 8 reviews. Sheldon Pearce of Pitchfork commented that "Jungle Rules doesn't answer any of the questions that have circled French Montana his entire career, chiefly: Can he be a leading man and can he be as interesting on wax as he is in the day to day? He has evolved quite a bit since Excuse My French, coming up with moments of sharpness, but he is still limited in what he can do. His music flattens the showy life he lives. If there's a case to be made for his vibrance, it isn't this." Riley Wallace of Exclaim! gave a positive review, stating French Montana "delivers a cohesive cover-to-cover platter of flame emojis that traverse his range". Neil Yeung of AllMusic wrote: "In the end, with enough highlights that could constitute a tighter and more effective track list, Jungle Rules suffers from lengthy playlist aspirations and not enough focus."

Commercial performance
Jungle Rules debuted at number three on the US Billboard 200 with 52,000 album-equivalent units, of which 16,000 were pure album sales in its first week. On June 11, 2020, the album was certified platinum by the Recording Industry Association of America (RIAA) for combined sales and album-equivalent units of over a million units in the United States.

Track listing

Track notes
  signifies a co-producer
  signifies an additional producer
  signifies an uncredited producer
 "Unforgettable" originally featured a guest verse from Jeremih

Sample credits
 "Jump" contains a sample of "Headlock", written and performed by Imogen Heap.
 "Bring Dem Things" contains a sample of "Last Hope's Gone", written by Paul Butterfield, Jim Haynie and David Sanborn, and performed by The Paul Buttefield Blues Band; samples of "Mingus Fingus No. 2", written and performed by Charles Mingus; and a sample of "Take Me to the Mardi Gras", written by Paul Simon, and performed by Bob James.
 "Bag" is a remix of "That Bag", written and performed by Ziico Niico.
 "Formula" is a remix of "Formula", written and performed by Alkaline.
 "White Dress" contains a sample of "Aeorien", written by Francisco Vidal, and performed by Fran Soto featuring Aeralie Bringhton.

Credits and personnel

Performance

 French Montana – primary artist
 Chinx – featured artist 
 Swae Lee – featured artist 
 The Weeknd – featured artist 
 Max B – featured artist 
 Travis Scott – featured artist 
 Pharrell Williams – featured artist 
 Ziico Niico – featured artist 
 Quavo – featured artist 
 Future – featured artist 
 T.I. – featured artist 
 Young Thug – featured artist 
 Marc E. Bassy – featured artist 
 Alkaline – featured artist 
 Fe – background vocals 
 Fernick Gibbs – background vocals 
 Rick Steel – background vocals 
 The Kid Daytona – background vocals 
 Dafina Zeqiri – background vocals 
 Terik Morris – speaker 
 Rico Love – background vocals

Production

 Puff Daddy – executive production
 French Montana – executive production
 Rick Steel – executive production, production , additional production 
 Ben Billions – production 
 C.P Dubb – production 
 Jaegan – production 
 1Mind – production 
 Harry Fraud – production 
 Nova – production 
 Floyd Bentley – production , co-production 
 Frank Dukes – production 
 Ism – production 
 Ziggy on the Keyboard – production 
 London on da Track – production 
 J Holt – production 
 Murda Beatz – production 
 Scott Storch – production 
 Beat Billionaire – production 
 Nic Nac – production 
 NightxNight – production 
 Alkaline – production 
 Lee Milla – production 
 DtownThaGreat – production 
 Rico Love – production 
 Alex Lustig – production 
 2Epik – production 
 Shaun Lopez – additional production 
 DaHeala – additional production 
 DannyBoyStyles – additional production 
 Masar – additional production 
 DanjaHandz – additional production 
 DaviDior – additional production 
 Pharrell Williams – co-production 
 Detail – co-production 
 CuBeatz – co-production

Technical

 Michelle Mancini – mastering 
 Dave Kutch – mastering 
 Jaycen Joshua – mixing 
 Fabian Marasciullo – mixing 
 Ell – recording 
 Rick Steel – recording 
 Floyd Bentley – recording 
 Harry Fraud – recording 
 Masar – recording 
 Shi Kamiyama  – recording 
 Jaydawn – recording 
 Evan LaRay Brunson – recording 
 Bijan – recording 
 Shawn Jarrett – recording 
 John Shullman –recording 
 David Nakaji – engineering assistance 
 Maddox Chim – engineering assistance 
 Raul Barcena – engineering assistance 
 Sean Klein – engineering assistance 
 McCoy Socalgargoyle – engineering assistance

Design
 Ben Swantek – art design and photography
 Koury Angelo – photography

Charts

Weekly charts

Year-end charts

Certifications

References

French Montana albums
2017 albums
Bad Boy Records albums
Epic Records albums
Albums produced by Cubeatz
Albums produced by Detail (record producer)
Albums produced by Frank Dukes
Albums produced by Harry Fraud
Albums produced by London on da Track
Albums produced by Mike Will Made It
Albums produced by Murda Beatz
Albums produced by Scott Storch